Thomas Joseph Alberghini (October 27, 1920 – November 26, 2013) was a professional American football offensive lineman in the National Football League. He was born in Peabody, Massachusetts.

References

External links
NFL.com profile

1920 births
2013 deaths
People from Peabody, Massachusetts
Sportspeople from Essex County, Massachusetts
Players of American football from Massachusetts
American football offensive guards
American football offensive tackles
Pittsburgh Steelers players
Holy Cross Crusaders football players